Ysgol Gyfun Gymraeg Bro Edern is an 11–18 mixed, Welsh-medium, community secondary school and sixth form in Penylan, Cardiff, Wales. The name 'Bro Edern' (Vale of Edern) refers to Saint Edern who is commemorated in the name Llanedeyrn. Of the three Welsh-medium secondary schools serving Cardiff, it is the newest (the others being Ysgol Gyfun Gymraeg Glantaf and Ysgol Gyfun Gymraeg Plasmawr).

History 
Ysgol Gyfun Gymraeg Bro Edern was founded in September 2012, as Cardiff's third Welsh-medium secondary school, due to increasing demand for Welsh-medium education in Cardiff. During its first academic year (2012–13) when it had 71 year 7 pupils, it was based temporarily on the site of Ysgol Gyfun Gymraeg Glantaf, before moving to its permanent buildings, the former site of St Teilo's Church in Wales High School by September 2013. The school was inspected for the first time in November 2017 when Estyn reported that "The school is a very close-knit community with an extremely caring and supportive ethos." Following the inspection, the school was invited by Estyn to prepare an effective practice report on its work in relation to the use that teachers and pupils make of information and communication technology to support learning and teaching.

References

External links 
 

Secondary schools in Cardiff
Welsh-language schools
Educational institutions established in 2012
2012 establishments in Wales